Magilligan railway station served the area of Magilligan in County Londonderry in Northern Ireland.

The Londonderry and Coleraine Railway opened the station on 1 November 1853.  A station building was erected between 1873 and 1875 to designs by the architect John Lanyon.

A very short-lived horse-drawn tram operated from this station to Magilligan Point in 1855. Towards the end of the station's life, it was used for prison visits to the nearby HMP Magilligan. It closed on 17 October 1976.

Routes

References

Disused railway stations in County Londonderry
Railway stations opened in 1853
Railway stations closed in 1976
Railway stations in the Republic of Ireland opened in 1853
Railway stations in Northern Ireland opened in the 19th century